Browns Yard  is a community in Weldford Parish, New Brunswick located 4.5 km NE of Fords Mills close to the intersection of Route 490 and Route 510.

The church is St. Paul's Anglican and it features an old cemetery where some of the earliest settlers to Weldford were buried and the church continues to be the center of family life with activities for children, youth and many family events hosted at their church hall.

Browns Yard is the location of the Annual Fishing Derby with around 200 participants enjoying a day full of family fun with a BBQ and chances to win prizes for the biggest fish and guessing the size of a salmon. The event attracts people from nearby communities of Elsipogtog, Richibucto and Rexton, New Brunswick.

History

Browns Yard was once called Upper Main River, with a Post Office from 1909-1956.  There is a church near the shore and this was the site of shipbuilding operations with 7 ships claimed to have been constructed at Browns Yard.

Notable people

See also
List of communities in New Brunswick

References

Settlements in New Brunswick
Communities in Kent County, New Brunswick